Charlie Shiel is a Scotland Club XV international rugby union player who plays for Edinburgh Rugby. His usual position is Scrum-half.

Rugby Union career

Amateur career

Shiel is the son of Graham Shiel, and grandson of Dougie Morgan; both former Scotland rugby union international players. A former pupil of the Royal High School, Edinburgh, Shiel played for their then associated side RHC Cougars. He signed for Currie in 2015. Shiel entered the Scottish Rugby Academy in the 2015-16 season as a Stage 2 player.

Professional career

Shiel was previously enrolled in the BT Sport Scottish Rugby Academy as a Stage 3 player. Stage 3 players are aligned to a professional club and given regional support. In 2016, 2016-17, Shiel first became a Stage 3 player assigned to Edinburgh Rugby Shiel remains a Stage 3 player for the 2017-18 season still assigned to Edinburgh Rugby. However Shiel has turned out for Glasgow Warriors in their 2017-18 pre-season match against Northampton Saints.

International career

Shiel has played for Scotland U16, scoring two tries in his 3 caps for the side. He made an appearance off the bench for the Scotland U18 side against England U18. He has had 10 caps for the Scotland U20 side. Shiel received his first call up to the senior Scotland squad in February 2021 for the 2021 Six Nations Championship.

References 

1997 births
Living people
Scottish rugby union players
Glasgow Warriors players
Currie RFC players
Edinburgh Rugby players
Scotland Club XV international rugby union players
Rugby union players from Melrose, Scottish Borders
Rugby union scrum-halves